"I'd Come for You" is the second European single (fourth in Canada) from Nickelback's 2008 album Dark Horse.  The song was written by the band and Mutt Lange. It was released March 23, 2009. "If Today Was Your Last Day" served as the third single instead in North America (after "Gotta Be Somebody" and the rock radio-only single "Something in Your Mouth"). Lyrically the song is emotional and not sexual, as some originally inferred from the title.

Music video

In an interview Chad Kroeger said they wanted to get Kevin Costner to star as the father in the video. Costner asked Chad Kroeger to be in one of their videos when they met previously. But when shooting for the video came along he was unable to make it.

Jessa Danielson, Don Broach and Craig Anderson play the three roles in the video. The video was shot in late January 2009 with long-time collaborator Nigel Dick directing the video. The video was released on March 23, 2009, in Canada. The video shows a father arriving home to find his daughter on her way out to go on a date with her boyfriend. Later on the boyfriend tries to sexually assault the daughter who makes two frantic calls to her father, one a text message with the same numbers, 77, in a photograph of the daughter and the father by a baseball field. He realizes she is in a situation at the baseball ground, therefore he goes looking for her. He arrives in time to pull the young man out of the car and punch him twice, then drives off with her crying in his arms. Shots throughout the video shows the band performing inside a concert garden.

Track listing
"I'd Come For You" (Album Version)
"I'd Come For You" (Edit)

German Track Listing
"I'd Come For You" (Edit)
"I'd Come For You" (Album Version)
"Far Away" (Live At Sturgis 2006)

Japan Track Listing
"I'd Come For You" (Edit)
"I'd Come For You" (Album Version)
"Photograph" (Live At Sturgis 2006)

Chart performance
"I'd Come for You" experienced chart success prior to its release as a single. Following Dark Horse's release, the song climbed as high as #14 on the U.S. iTunes Store, fueling a #44 debut on the Billboard Hot 100. It also debuted the same week at #53 on the Canadian Hot 100 and re-entered the chart months later rising to #29. The song also peaked to #1 on the UK Rock Chart.

Charts

Weekly charts

Year-end charts

References 

2009 singles
Nickelback songs
Song recordings produced by Robert John "Mutt" Lange
Music videos directed by Nigel Dick
Songs written by Chad Kroeger
Songs written by Robert John "Mutt" Lange
2008 songs
Roadrunner Records singles
Songs about sexual assault
Works about rape